Omm ol Khassa-ye Sofla (also Romanized as Omm ol Khas̄s̄á-ye Soflá and Omm ol Khes̄s̄á-ye Soflá; also known as Omm Khos̄ī-ye Pā’īn, Omm Khos̄ī-ye Soflá, Omm ol Khashā Soflá, and Omm ol Khes̄ey-ye Pā’īn) is a village in Abdoliyeh-ye Gharbi Rural District, in the Central District of Ramshir County, Khuzestan Province, Iran. At the 2006 census, its population was 80, in 14 families.

References 

Populated places in Ramshir County